Osawatomie Brown is an 1859 play by Kate Edwards, about John Brown's attack on slave owners in Kansas, and its sequel, his raid on Harper's Ferry. The play premiered just two weeks after Brown's execution.

References

American plays
Plays about race and ethnicity
John Brown (abolitionist)
Plays set in Kansas
Plays based on real people
1859 plays